The 2013 Ball Hockey World Championship was the tenth ball hockey world championship held by ISBHF in St.John's, Canada.  Slovakia won their second title. Canada captured the bronze medal with a 7 – 3 victory over the Portugal. The Canada women's national ball hockey team captured the gold medal in women's play, avenging the silver medal from 2011.

Group A

Group B

Matches 7th-10th

9th place

7th place

Play off

Quarterfinal

Semifinal

Bronze medal game

Final

Final standings

B-Pool 

Ball Hockey World Championship
Ball Hockey World Championship